Valea Strâmbă may refer to the following places in Romania:

 Valea Strâmbă, Harghita, a village in the commune Suseni, Harghita County
 Valea Strâmbă, a tributary of the Valea Cheii in Argeș County
 Valea Strâmbelor, a tributary of the Bârsa Fierului in Brașov County

See also 
 Strâmba (disambiguation)